La Fuerza del Destino is Fey's fifth studio album, released in December 2004. The album contains twelve tracks the popular Spanish band Mecano made famous in the 80s and early 90s.

The album's first single La Fuerza del Destino became the album's biggest hit, as it quickly topped the charts in Latin America and became No.1 in Mexico, Central America and Chile, as well as a top 5 hit in the world Latin charts. The album itself became No. 5 in Mexico and succeeded in positioning itself among the top 50 Latin albums in the United States, at #42.

The album was also nominated to a Latin Grammy for "Best Latin Pop Female Album" in 2005; but lost to Escucha by Italian singer Laura Pausini.

The album to date has sold more than 550,000 copies worldwide.

Track listing

Singles

Certifications

References

 [ AMG]

2004 albums
Fey (singer) albums